The 2018 Australian Mixed Curling Championship was held from June 7 to 10, 2018 at the Naseby Curling Club in Naseby, New Zealand. The winners of this championship will represent Australia at the 2018 World Mixed Curling Championship.

At the same time 2018 Australian Men's Curling Championship and 2018 Australian Women's Curling Championship were held at the Naseby Curling Club.

Teams
The teams are listed as follows:

Triple Knock-out

Stage 1

Stage 2

Stage 3

Final standings

See also
 2018 Australian Men's Curling Championship
 2018 Australian Women's Curling Championship
 2018 Australian Mixed Doubles Curling Championship
 2018 Australian Junior Curling Championship
 2018 Australian Senior Curling Championship

References

Australian Mixed
Curling Mixed
Australian Mixed Curling Championship
Australian Mixed Curling
Curling Mixed
Australian Mixed Curling
Curling competitions in New Zealand